The Thin Line, later re-issued as Murder, My Love, is a 1951 crime novel by the British-Lebanese author Edward Atiyah. It was filmed twice, first as The Stranger Within a Woman by Naruse Mikio, 1966, and then by Claude Chabrol, as Just Before Nightfall, 1971.

References

1951 British novels
British novels adapted into films
Peter Davies books